The 2019-20 St. Lawrence Saints Men's ice hockey season was the 80th season of play for the program and the 59th season in the ECAC Hockey conference. The Saints represented the St. Lawrence University and played their home games at both the Roos House and Appleton Arena and were coached by Brent Brekke, in his 1st season.

Season
Due to renovations to their regular home venue, the Appleton Arena, St. Lawrence began their season using SUNY-Canton's building for scheduled home games. Construction delays further pushed back the Appleton Arena opener until the end of January. By that time, however, their season was a shambles with the team recording only 3 wins in 25 games.

Roster

As of November 26, 2019.

Standings

Schedule and Results

|-
!colspan=12 style=";" | Regular Season

|-
!colspan=12 style=";" | 

|-
!colspan=12 style=";" | 

|- align="center" bgcolor="#e0e0e0"
|colspan=12|St. Lawrence Lost Series 0–2

Scoring Statistics

Goaltending statistics

Rankings

References

St. Lawrence Saints men's ice hockey seasons
St. Lawrence Saints
St. Lawrence Saints
2019 in sports in New York (state)
2020 in sports in New York (state)